Syllabub  is a sweet dish made by curdling sweet cream or milk with an acid such as wine or cider. It was a popular British confection from the 16th to the 19th centuries. 

Early recipes for syllabub are for a drink of cider with milk. By the 17th century it had evolved into a type of dessert made with sweet white wine. More wine could be added to make a punch, but it could also be made to have a thicker consistency that could be eaten with a spoon, used as a topping for trifle, or to dip fingers of sponge cake into. The holiday punch, sweet and frothy, was often considered a ladies' drink. The milk and cream used in those days would have been thicker and modern recipes may need to make some adjustments to achieve the same effect.

History

Syllabub (or solybubbe, sullabub, sullibib, sullybub, sullibub; there is no certain etymology and considerable variation in spelling) has been known in England at least since John Heywood's Thersytes of about 1537: "You and I... Muste walke to him and eate a solybubbe."  The word occurs repeatedly, including in Samuel Pepys's diary for 12 July 1663; "Then to Comissioner Petts and had a good Sullybub" and in Thomas Hughes's Tom Brown at Oxford of 1861; "We retire to tea or syllabub beneath the shade of some great oak."

Hannah Glasse, in the 18th century, published the recipe for whipt syllabubs in The Art of Cookery Made Plain and Easy. The recipe included
a quart of thick cream, and half a pint of sack, the juice of two Seville oranges or lemons, grate in the peel of two lemons, half a pound of double refined sugar.
The ingredients were whipped together, and then poured into glasses. The curdled cream separated and floated to the top of the glass.

See also
 Cranachan, a similar dessert from Scotland
Posset

References

External links
'Syllabub' at Foods of England
Syllabub recipe with wine

British desserts
English cuisine
Milk dishes
Foods with alcoholic drinks